Rudolph G. "Bunky" Matthews (August 14, 1915 – September 28, 1976) was an American football and basketball coach. He served as the head football coach at Bethune–Cookman University in Daytona Beach, Florida from 1946 to 1960, compiling a record of 83–46–6. He is widely credited as being the first football coach in the modern, competitive era of Bethune–Cookman football history.
Matthews was also the head basketball coach at Bethune–Cookman from 1947 to 1956, tallying a mark of 90–47.

Matthews died of a heart attack, on September 28, 1976.

Head coaching record

Football

References

External links
 

1915 births
1976 deaths
Bethune–Cookman Wildcats athletic directors
Bethune–Cookman Wildcats football coaches
Bethune–Cookman Wildcats football players
Bethune–Cookman Wildcats men's basketball coaches
Edward Waters Tigers football coaches
Morehouse Maroon Tigers football players
Columbia University alumni
African-American coaches of American football
African-American players of American football
African-American basketball coaches
African-American college athletic directors in the United States
20th-century African-American sportspeople